Quo graviora was an apostolic constitution promulgated by Pope Leo XII on March 13, 1825, in which he decreed the prohibition of membership in Masonic lodges in perpetuity.

See also  

 Anti-Masonry
 Declaration concerning status of Catholics becoming Freemasons
 Papal ban of Freemasonry
 Papal documents relating to Freemasonry

External links 
 English version of the encyclical
 Original Latin version of the encyclical

1825 in Christianity
1825 in Europe
1825 documents
March 1825 events
Catholicism and Freemasonry
Documents of Pope Leo XII